Komjatná is a village and municipality in Ružomberok District in the Žilina Region of northern Slovakia.

Etymology

Komňatná → Komjatná. "Something that has a relationship to the chamber" (Slovak komnata: a chamber), "the village with guest chambers".

History
In historical records the village was first mentioned in 1330 (Komnathna).

Geography
The municipality lies at an altitude of 634 metres and covers an area of 14.543 km². It has a population of about 1483 people.

Genealogical resources

The records for genealogical research are available at the state archive "Statny Archiv in Bytca, Slovakia"

 Roman Catholic church records (births/marriages/deaths): 1710-1900 (parish A)

See also
 List of municipalities and towns in Slovakia

References

External links
https://web.archive.org/web/20080111223415/http://www.statistics.sk/mosmis/eng/run.html 
Surnames of living people in Komjatna

Villages and municipalities in Ružomberok District